Qingling is a female given name of Chinese origin that may refer to:

Soong Ching-ling (1893–1981), Chinese politician
Song Qingling (field hockey) (born 1986), Chinese field hockey player
Wang Qingling (born 1993), Chinese heptathlete

Places
 Qinling, another name for the Qin Mountains of central China, running from Gansu to Hubei

See also
Qingling Motors, Chinese automotive and commercial vehicle manufacturer

Chinese feminine given names